Atatürk Kültür Merkezi is an underground station of the Ankara Metro in Altındağ, Ankara. It is a stop on the M1 line as well as the southern terminus of the M4 line. The station is located along Istanbul Avenue at the intersection with Kazım Karabekir Avenue. Connection to EGO Bus service is available on Istanbul Avenue. The M1 station was opened on 29 December 1997, while the M4 station opened 19 years later on 5 January 2017.

Nearby places of interest
 Atatürk Cultural Center
 Ankara 19 Mayıs Stadium

References

External links
EGO Ankara - Official website
Ankaray - Official website

Images

Railway stations opened in 1996
Ankara metro stations
1996 establishments in Turkey
Metro Ankara